David Fernández Domingo (born 16 February 1977 in Villaconejos) is a Spanish former cyclist.

Major results
2001
2nd GP Llodio
2002
1st Stage 3 Vuelta a Castilla y León
1st Stage 5 Vuelta a Burgos
2003
1st Stage 2 Grande Prémio Mosqueteros-Ruta del Marqués
2005
1st Circuito de Getxo

References

1977 births
Living people
Spanish male cyclists
Cyclists from the Community of Madrid